St Bride's Church is a church in the City of London, England. The building's most recent incarnation was designed by Sir Christopher Wren in 1672 in Fleet Street in the City of London, though Wren's original building was largely gutted by fire during the London Blitz in 1940. Due to its location in Fleet Street, it has a long association with journalists and newspapers. The church is a distinctive sight on London's skyline and is clearly visible from a number of locations. Standing 226 feet (69m) high, it is the second tallest of all Wren's churches, with only St Paul's itself having a higher pinnacle.

Background

Origins

St Bride's may be one of the most ancient churches in London, with worship perhaps dating back to the conversion of the Middle Saxons in the 7th century. It is believed that its name is derived from Bridget of Ireland, the patron saint of Ireland. It may have been founded by Irish monks, missionaries proselytising the English. It is believed that the original church, founded around the 6th Century by Irish missionaries, is the only such celtic Irish founded church in the east of Britain.

The present St Bride's is at least the seventh church to have stood on the site. Traditionally, it was founded by St Bridget in the sixth century. Whether or not she founded it personally, the remnants of the first church appear to have significant similarities to a church of the same date in Kildare, Ireland. The Norman church, built in the 11th century, was of both religious and secular significance; in 1210, King John held a parliament there. It was replaced by a larger church in the 15th century,

St Bride's association with the newspaper business began in 1500, when Wynkyn de Worde set up a printing press next door. Until 1695, London was the only city in England where printing was permitted by law.

Roanoke colony
In the late 1580s, Eleanor White, daughter to artist and explorer John White, was married in St Bride's to the tiler and bricklayer Ananias Dare. Their daughter, Virginia Dare, was to be the first English child born in North America. She was born on Roanoke Island on 18 August 1587: "Elenora, daughter to the governour and wife to Ananias Dare, one of the assistants, was delivered of a daughter in Roanoke". The child was healthy and "was christened there the Sunday following, and because this childe was the first Christian borne in Virginia, she was named Virginia". A modern bust of Virginia Dare stands near the font (one of the few survivals from the original church)  replacing an earlier monument which was stolen and has not been recovered.

Great Fire of London

In the mid-17th century disaster struck. In 1665, the Great Plague of London killed 238 parishioners in a single week, and in 1666, the following year, the church was completely destroyed during the Great Fire of London, which burned much of the city. After the fire, the old church was replaced by an entirely new building designed by Sir Christopher Wren, one of his largest and most expensive works, taking seven years to build.

St Bride's was reopened on 19 December 1675. The famous spire was added later, in 1701–1703. It originally measured 234 ft, but lost its upper eight feet to a lightning strike in 1764; this was then bought by the then owner of Park Place, Berkshire, where it still resides. The design utilises four octagonal stages of diminishing height, capped with an obelisk which terminates in a ball and vane.

Buried at St Bride's is Robert Levet (Levett), a Yorkshireman who became a Parisian waiter, then a "practicer of physick" who ministered to the denizens of London's seedier neighbourhoods. Having been duped into a bad marriage, the hapless Levet was taken in by the author Samuel Johnson who wrote his poem "On the Death of Mr. Robert Levet", eulogising his good friend and tenant of many years. Also buried at St Bride's are the organist and composer Thomas Weelkes (d. 1623) and the poet Richard Lovelace (d.1658), as well as author Samuel Richardson (d. 1761)

The wedding cake is said to date back to 1703 when Thomas Rich, a baker's apprentice from Ludgate Hill, fell in love with the daughter of his employer and asked her to marry him. He wanted to make an extravagant cake, and drew on the design of St Bride's Church for inspiration.

Second World War
On the night of 29 December 1940, during the Blitz of central London in the Second World War, the church was gutted by fire-bombs dropped by the Luftwaffe. That night 1,500 fires were started, including three major conflagrations, leading to a fire storm, an event dubbed the Second Great Fire of London, due to the enormous amount of damage caused.  St Paul's Cathedral itself was only saved by the dedication of the London firemen who kept the fire away from the cathedral and the volunteer firewatchers of the St Paul's Watch who fought to keep the flames from firebombs on the roof from spreading. After the war, St Bride's was rebuilt at the expense of newspaper proprietors and journalists.

One fortunate and unintended consequence of the bombing was the excavation of the church's original 6th century Saxon foundations. Today, the crypt known as the Museum of Fleet Street is open to the public and contains a number of ancient relics, including Roman coins and medieval stained glass.
Post-war excavations also uncovered nearly 230 lead coffins with plaques dating from the 17th, 18th and early 19th centuries, filled with the bones of parishioners; causes of death for most of them were found by the Museum of London.

Modern era

The church was designated a Grade I listed building on 4 January 1950.

In September 2007 the former rector, Archdeacon the Venerable David Meara, announced a special appeal to raise  £3.5 million to preserve the church's unique heritage and in November 2007 Queen Elizabeth II was guest of honour at a service to celebrate the fiftieth anniversary of the restoration work necessary after the Second World War.

In March 2012, the Inspire! appeal was launched to raise the at least £2.5m needed to repair the crumbling stonework of the church's famous spire.

In March 2016 the wedding of Jerry Hall and Rupert Murdoch was celebrated at St Bride's.

Music

Choir 
The choir in its present form (12 adult singers – 4 sopranos, 2 altos, 3 tenors and 3 basses) was established in time for the re-dedication service in 1957, and has remained more or less in this format ever since. The choir sings at two services each Sunday throughout the year (reducing to 8 singers during August) and also for numerous special services. The Director of Music is Robert Jones, and the Assistant Director of Music is Matthew Morley.

Organ 
The organ was built by the John Compton Organ Company, and is arguably their finest work. It was ready for the rededication of the church in November 1957. It has recently been completely overhauled and cleaned by Keith Bance, who has carried out some modest tonal updating. This included remodelling the positive division, adding new mixture stops to the great and pedal divisions and the provision of a new Vox Humana for the solo division. These changes have further increased the resources of an already versatile instrument. The organ has four manuals, 98 speaking stops, close to 4,000 pipes, a multi-level capture system and the wind is provided by four blowing installations.

Organists

 Henry Lightindollar 1696–1702
 John Weldon 1702–1736
 Samuel Howard 1736–1782
 Richard Huddleston Potter 1782–1821
 George Mather 1821–1854
 Mr. Reynolds, from 1854
 Ernest Kiver, from 1882
 John D. Codner, until 1888 (later organist of St Davids Cathedral)
 Edmund Hart Turpin 1888–1907
 Herbert Townsend 1909–ca. 1921
 Gordon Reynolds 1952–1965
 Robert Langston 1972–1988
 Robert Harre-Jones, from 1988

Bells 
St Bride's Church is noted as the site of the first ever full peal on twelve bells (5060 Grandsire Cinques), and is considered to be one of the first towers which had a diatonic ring of twelve bells. Ten bells were cast for the church in 1710 by Abraham Rudhall of Gloucester, and were augmented to twelve in 1719 with the addition of two trebles. The 5th and 6th bells were recast by Samuel Knight of Holborn in 1736.

All of the bells were destroyed on 29 December 1940 during the Blitz. After the war, a single bell cast by John Taylor & Co was placed in the tower, hung for full-circle ringing, but was never joined by any other bells. During the installation, the church and foundry made sure that it was sympathetic to a future 12-bell installation. It weighs 15 hundredweight in the key of F♯ , and would be the 10th of a new ring of 12 in D.

Notable parishioners

St Bride's has had a number of notable parishioners, including John Milton, John Dryden, and the diarist Samuel Pepys, who was baptized in the church. Pepys buried his brother Tom in the church in 1664, but by this stage the vaults were so overcrowded that Pepys had to bribe the gravedigger to "justle together" the corpses in order to make room. In 2009, Sir Clement Freud's funeral was held in the church.

Notable burials in the churchyard
 Richard Lovelace, poet
 Denis Papin, steam engine pioneer
 Samuel Richardson, novelist
 Thomas Weelkes, composer
William Charles Wells, physician, formulated early ideas of natural selection

Gallery

See also

 Bridewell Theatre
 List of Christopher Wren churches in London
 St Bride Library
 Anna Popplewell - British actress from The Chronicles of Narnia who portrayed Susan Pevensie, also a member of Congregation as her mother Debra Lomas was a churchwarden.

References
 
 
 Milne, Gustav, St. Bride's Church London: Archaeological research 1952-60 and 1992-5, English Heritage, London (1997)
 Milton, Giles, Big Chief Elizabeth – How England's Adventurers Gambled and Won the New World, Hodder & Stoughton, London (2000)
 Morgan, Dewi, Phoenix of Fleet St – 2,000 years of St Bride's, Charles Knight & Co., London (1973),

Notes

Further reading
 
 .

External links

 
 Mystery Worshipper Report at the Ship of Fools website
 360° panorama inside St Bride's Church

Christopher Wren church buildings in London
Church of England church buildings in the City of London
English Baroque church buildings
17th-century Church of England church buildings
Bride's
Buildings and structures in the United Kingdom destroyed during World War II
Rebuilt churches in the United Kingdom
Diocese of London
Grade I listed churches in the City of London